The Pioneer Playhouse, located in Danville, Kentucky, is the oldest outdoor theater in the state of Kentucky.

History

The Pioneer Playhouse was built by Col. Eben C. Henson who established the outdoor theater in 1950. Notable alumni actors include John Travolta, Lee Majors, then known as Harvey Yeary, and Jim Varney. In 1962, Pioneer Playhouse became the first theater in the nation to be accorded the legal status of State Theater by act of Legislation.

Since Henson's death in 2004 the theater has been run by Henson's widow, Charlotte. Her daughter Holly served as artistic director until her death in 2012. Robby Henson, her son, directs at least one play at the theater every summer.

Productions
2020 (season curtailed due to COVID-19 pandemic)
Maybe Baby, It's You by Charlie Shanian and Shari Simpson
2019
Kong's Night Out by Jack Neary
Sherlock Holmes and the Ice Palace Murders by Jeffrey Hatcher, based on the novel by Larry Millett
Breaking Up With Elvis by Robby Henson
Not Now Darling by Ray Cooney and John Chapman
Red, White and Tuna by Ed Howard, Joe Sears, and Jason Williams
2018
The Return of Tinker Doyle (sequel to 2013's Search for Tinker Doyle) by Elizabeth Orndorff
Drinking Habits 2: Caught in the Act by Tom Smith
Granted (sequel to Grounded and Guarded) by Holly Hepp-Galván and Robby Henson (adapted from the novel by Angela Correll)
Unnecessary Farce by Paul Slade Smith
Living on Love by Joe DiPietro
2017
Death by Darkness by Elizabeth Orndorff. The production was directed by Anthony Haigh.
Drinking Habits by Tom Smith
Guarded (sequel to 2015's Grounded) by Holly Hepp-Galván and Robby Henson (adapted from the novel by Angela Correll)
Baskerville: A Sherlock Holmes Mystery by Ken Ludwig
Elvis Has Left the Building by V. Cate and Duke Ernsberger
2016
One Man, Two Guvnors by Richard Bean
Mom's Gift by Phil Olson
Good Blues Tonight by Robby Henson
The Tell-Tale Farce by Don Zolidis
The Murder Room by Jack Sharkey
2015
One Slight Hitch by Lewis Black
La Bete (The Beast) by David Herson
Grounded by Chelsea Marcantel (adapted from the novel by Angela Correll)
Sherlock's Secret Life by Will Severin, Ed Lange
Boeing, Boeing! by Marc Camoletti, Beverley Cross, Francis Evans
2014
Whodunnit, Darling? by Charles Edward Pogue and Larry Drake
Is He Dead? by Mark Twain, adapted by David Ives
The Wonder Team by Robby Henson
Walking Across Egypt by Catherine Bush (adapted from the novel by Clyde Edgerton)
A Visit from Scarface by V. Cate and Duke Ernsberger 
2013
Deathtrap by Ira Levin 
Tamed by Holly Hepp-Galvan, adapted from Taming of the Shrew
The Search for Tinker Doyle by Elizabeth Orndorff
Moon Over Buffalo by Ken Ludwig 
Cockeyed by Samuel French 
2012
Dracula Bites! by V. Cate and Duke Ernsberger 
Picasso at the Lapin Agile by Steve Martin
Bottoms Up! by Gregg Kreutz
High Strangeness by Elizabeth Orndorff 
Tuna Does Vegas by Jaston Williams, Joe Sears and Ed Howard 
2011
The 39 Steps adapted by Patrick Barlow
Tartuffe: The Southern Version adapted from Moliere
That Madcap Moon by Janet Henson Dow
Don't Cry for Me, Margaret Mitchell by V. Cate and Duke Ernsberger 
Kosher Lutherans by William Missouri Downs 
2010
A Nice Family Gathering by Phil Olson 
Miranda: The Catch of the Day (Adapted from Miranda, by Peter Blackmore)
The Dillinger Dilemma (World Premiere by Elizabeth Orndorff)
For Better by Eric Coble The production was directed by Katherine M. Carter
Run for Your Wife by Ray Cooney The production was directed by Lawrence Lesher
2009
M is for Million by Jack Sharkey
The Infamous Ephraim by Holly Henson
Lend Me a Tenor by Ken Ludwig
Girl Crazy by Guy Bolton & John McGowan
Be My Baby by Ken Ludwig
2008
Leading Ladies by Ken Ludwig
Mornings at Seven by Paul Osborn. 
Death by Darkness by Elizabeth Orndorff. The production was directed by Lawrence Lesher.
Love, Sex and the IRS by Billy Van Zandt and Jane Milmore. The production was directed by Synge Maher.
Cookin' with Gus by Jim Brochu. The production was directed by Lawrence Lesher.
2007
Babe, The Sheep Pig by David Wood. The production was directed by Robby Henson.
The Servant of Two Masters by Carlo Goldoni. The production was directed by Lawrence Lesher.
The Odd Couple by Neil Simon. The production was directed by Lawrence Lesher.
A Jarful of Fireflies by Catherine Bush. The production was directed by Robby Henson.
Greater Tuna by Jaston Williams, Joe Sears, & Ed Howard
2006
My Sister Eileen by Joseph A. Fields & Jerome Chodorov
Rumors by Neil Simon
Shakespeare in Hollywood by Ken Ludwig
Wait Until Dark by Frederick Knott
Social Security by Andrew Bergman
2005
On the Razzle by Tom Stoppard
Squabbles by Marshall Karp
The Man Who Came to Dinner by Moss Hart & George S. Kaufman
The Last of Jane Austen by Shirl Hendryx
Death by Golf by Gregg Kreutz
2004
Mr. Shaw Goes to Hollywood by Mark Saltzman
Cactus Flower by Abe Burrows
The Village Wooing by George Bernard Shaw
Sherlock's Secret Life by Will Severin, Ed Lange
Biloxi Blues by Neil Simon
2003
Impossible Marriage by Beth Henley
A Little Family Business by Jay Presson Allen
Fiddler on the Roof
Proposals by Neil Simon
Sylvia by A.R. Gurney
 1997
 Moon Over Buffalo
 The Liar
 Summer and Smoke
 A Flea in Her Ear
 Cookin' with Gus
 1996
 King of Hearts
 That Madcap Moon
 Sylvia
 Spider's Web
 Crossing Delancey
1995
The Nerd
Tom Jones
Any Given Day
Harvey by Mary Chase
My Fat Friend by Charles Laurence
 1994
 Boy Meets Girl
 Look Howard, Angel
 The Man Who Came to Dinner
 Scapino!
 Social Security
 1993
 Lend Me A Tenor
 Murder on the Nile
 The Traveling Lady
 Arsenic and Old Lace
 Beau Jest
 1992
 The Matchmaker
 Will Heal This Land
 Born Yesterday
 And A Nightingale Sang
 I Hate Hamlet
 1991
 Noises Off
 The Front Page
 My Three Angels
 Postmortem
 Alone Together

References

External links

The Pioneer Playhouse official web site

Theatres in Kentucky
Buildings and structures in Danville, Kentucky
Tourist attractions in Boyle County, Kentucky